Major League Rugby (MLR) is an autonomous semi-professional rugby union competition for privately owned, for-profit franchise clubs in North America. In the 2022 season it was contested by thirteen teams: twelve from the United States and one from Canada. While operating outside of the governance and oversight of the national governing body, the league is officially sanctioned by USA Rugby—a member union of Rugby Americas North (RAN)—and is consequently part of World Rugby. The league was founded in 2017 and is headquartered in Dallas, Texas. 

MLR began its first season in 2018 with seven teams. The league has since expanded several times - the 2022 season was marked by the disqualification, and subsequent departure, of two teams from the Western Conference, LA Giltinis and Austin Gilgronis. This setback was offset with the announcement of a new franchise in Chicago, starting 2023, opening the competition to the Midwestern United States for the first time and bringing the circuit back to twelve teams.

Major League Rugby implemented its first collegiate MLR Draft in 2020. Also in 2020, Major League Rugby teams started forming youth academies.

History

Founding

In September 2016, with at least five amateur rugby union clubs across the United States discussing a possible professional league, Dean Howes, who had previously been an executive with Major League Soccer's Real Salt Lake and the St. Louis Blues of the National Hockey League, stepped in as senior strategic advisor for Rugby Utah in an attempt to provide a pathway for expanding professional rugby stateside.

By February 2017, a total of nine amateur rugby union organizations including the Austin Huns, Dallas Griffins, Glendale Raptors, Houston Strikers, Kansas City Blues, Minneapolis, New Orleans RFC, Rugby Utah and the Seattle Saracens, announced their intentions to form a professional league to begin play the following year.

On August 15, 2017, the Austin Huns announced that it would opt-out of MLR in favor of allowing a newly branded spinoff, the Austin Elite compete in the league. The Houston Strikers rebranded themselves as the Houston SaberCats. Whereas the elite players of New Orleans, Utah, and Seattle became the New Orleans Gold, Utah Warriors, and Seattle Seawolves respectively, interests in Minneapolis were replaced by the San Diego Legion. With Kansas City and Dallas still in planning stages, the league continued as seven members for its inaugural season.

On November 6, 2017, Major League Rugby and CBS Sports Network announced a multi-year television partnership which marked MLR's first major television deal for broadcast rights. It was the first time in American history that a new sporting league had a national television deal prior to launch.

Early seasons and rapid expansion
The first regular-season game in Major League Rugby history was held on April 21, 2018, when the Houston SaberCats hosted the New Orleans Gold. The final was contested between the Seattle Seawolves and the Colorado Raptors, with the Seawolves winning 23-19 to become the inaugural champions.

In addition to Rugby United New York, the Toronto Arrows joined the league ahead of 2019 season as the first Canadian team in MLR. Three further American clubs began play in 2020, with the New England Free Jacks, Old Glory DC, and Rugby ATL. With the opening of Aveva Stadium as Houston's permanent stadium in April 2019, MLR gained its first stadium that was specifically built for league play.

Later in April, RUNY announced the signing of French international Mathieu Bastareaud on a loan deal from Toulon for the 2020 season. In October 2019, another major signing was made when it was announced that All Blacks international and multiple World Cup winner Ma'a Nonu would join the San Diego Legion for the 2020 season. The following December saw another World Cup winner sign with the league, namely South Africa prop Tendai Mtawarira with Old Glory DC.

On March 12, 2020, MLR initially suspended its 2020 season for 30 days due to the coronavirus pandemic but then cancelled the remainder of the entire season on March 18, after five rounds had been played. 

On April 9, 2020, the Colorado Raptors announced they were leaving the league. On May 28, 2020, the LA Giltinis were added as an expansion team based in Los Angeles to begin competition in the 2021 season. The name is a combination of the word "martini" and the last name of owner Adam Gilchrist. This was followed on June 4, 2020, with the addition of Dallas Jackals based in Dallas, Texas, for the 2021 season. However, on January 19, 2021, Dallas announced that the team would postpone their inaugural season to 2022.

On October 25, 2022, Major League Rugby announced that 12 teams would compete in the 2023 season, but that neither the Austin Gilgronis, nor the LA Giltinis will participate. With the uncertainties surrounding Austin and Los Angeles' team ownership, it was determined to suspend operations of the two teams to ensure a successful 2023 season, and protect the long-term strength of the league.  The MLR announced on November 17, 2022, that the latest expansion team would be the Chicago Hounds who will compete as 12th MLR team in the 2023 season in MLR's Western Conference.

On February 8, 2023, Major League Rugby announced that the Miami Sharks will join the competition for the 2024 season.

Competition format 
Major League Rugby spans five months from Late February through to Early July. The 2019 regular season was a double round-robin with all clubs playing each other home and away. Each team played sixteen games, half of them at home. This was followed by a postseason for the top four teams consisting of two semi-final matches and the Championship Game to determine the season's MLR champion team.

From the 2020 season, MLR changed to a conference format. Both conferences, the Western Conference and the Eastern Conference, consist of six teams (seven teams took part in the 2022 Western Conference). Each team plays a double round-robin within their conference, home and away, in addition to playing six games against teams from the other conference, for a total of 16 regular-season games. The postseason consists of the top three teams from each conference: a wildcard game between the second and third ranked teams, followed by a playoff game between the wildcard winner and the first ranked team in the conference. The resulting playoff winners from each conference then face off in the league championship.

The league is structured as a closed system and, similar to other American sports leagues, does not have promotion and relegation. It operates as a single entity similar to Major League Soccer and other major professional sports leagues in the United States and Canada, with each team or "franchise" owned by the league and the franchise operators owning a share of the league.

Teams

Map

2023 teams
The twelve teams competing in the 2023 Major League Rugby season are divided into two conferences. The twelfth team, Chicago Hounds, was announced to be joining the Western Conference on November 17, 2022.

Timeline

Expansion teams

The expansion franchise fee is US$4 million as of 2019. 

The Mexican Rugby Federation is exploring adding an MLR team.

On February 8, 2023, it was announced that the Miami Sharks would be joining the league in 2024.

Former teams

On April 9, 2020, the Colorado Raptors announced that they would withdraw from Major League Rugby after three seasons in the league, effective May 2, 2020, the first team to do so. Their announcement explained their withdrawal by saying that "our greater responsibility lies in the development of American players who can win the World Cup for the United States." Asked to explain how withdrawing from the league would help to develop American rugby players, the Raptors referred the question to Glendale City Manager Linda Cassaday, who said on April 10, 2020, that MLR had been founded with a core mission of developing American rugby players and originally had limited teams to three foreign players, although this expanded to five players before the first season began in 2018. MLR had expanded from seven teams in 2018 to 12 in 2020 without having enough American players to fill out rosters and had raised the ceiling on foreign players to 10 per team. The Raptors believed that both this overall number of foreign players and the higher proportion of foreign to American players no longer best served the goal of developing American players who could compete successfully in the Rugby World Cup, and therefore chose to withdraw from the league to better focus their efforts on the development of American players who could compete on an international stage.

On October 25, 2022, Major League Rugby announced that 12 teams would compete in the 2023 season, but that neither the Austin Gilgronis, nor the LA Giltinis will participate. With the uncertainties surrounding Austin and Los Angeles' team ownership, it was determined to suspend operations of the two teams to ensure a successful 2023 season, and protect the long-term strength and continued growth of the league.

Champions

By year

By team

MLR rivalry cups

In Major League Rugby, several teams annually compete for secondary rivalry cups. Most cups are deliberately conceived as local derbies between teams in the same region.

Summary
Each win is counted as an official title. Only official MLR games are considered as official rivalry games unless an exhibition game is specifically marked as a Rivalry game. Several teams now participating in cups played matches before the creation of the cups.

Active

Inactive 
These Cups are currently listed as inactive, due to teams withdrawing from Major League Rugby. Individual cups may return with new teams in the future.

Players
Major League Rugby players include those drawn from North American clubs, as well as foreign signings. Although the original concept was to limit club to three foreign players, the limit grew to five before the start of the first season, before then being increased to ten. This increased allotment of foreign players led to some criticism that MLR was not providing enough opportunities for American players to develop.

Awards

MLR season

MLR championship

Television coverage
For the 2022 season, MLR and FOX Sports have partnered up once again to broadcast the matches. MLR Commissioner George Killebrew said, "Having FOX Sports involved as the national television broadcaster for Major League Rugby this season is an amazing opportunity for the league. FOX Sports' reach and audience will not only bring our fans the rugby coverage they expect but also introduce our sport to entirely new rugby fans."

Major League Rugby programming runs in prime weekend time slots on Saturday afternoons and Sunday evenings.

The CBS Sports Network televises 13 matches nationally over the course of the season. This includes a Game of the Week during each of the 10 rounds of the MLR regular season along with all three post-season matches. Live streaming is also available through the CBS Sports Network streaming platforms. Dan Power (Play By Play), Brian Hightower (Color Analyst) and Stacy Paetz (Sideline) were the CBS Sports commentators for the 2019 season. The remaining games are available on ESPN properties and regional sports networks.

ESPN has the national and international rights to an 18-game package covering regular season matches to audiences across its various platforms.

AT&T Sports Networks have a 17-game package covering six of the seven MLR teams for games not broadcast on the CBS Sports Network. Home-and-away matches for Austin, Houston and New Orleans are carried on AT&T SportsNet Southwest. Seattle's matches are carried on Root Sports Northwest and all Colorado and Utah games are hosted on AT&T SportsNet Rocky Mountain.

San Diego has a separate local rights agreement for their market with all the Legion's home-and-away MLR games that are not on the CBS Sports Network being televised locally on Channel 4 YurView California.

Austin Elite Rugby partnered with Facebook Watch for their Texas-based viewers during the 2019 season.

Rugby United New York announced regional television partnership with SNY, which will televise nine games of RUNY's inaugural season (2019), with the premiere game airing LIVE Sunday, January 27 at 5:00 PM EST. Also, NBC Sports Washington and NBC Sports Philadelphia+ will join SNY in televising match coverage of eight remaining games, beginning Saturday February 16 at 3 PM EST when RUNY travels to face the NOLA Gold. The partnership with the NBC Sports Regional Networks expands RUNY's TV market into two key East Coast markets.

Toronto Arrows Rugby announced a television partnership with GameTV for the 2019 season.

The 2019 Championship game was broadcast on CBS, the first MLR game to be televised on free-to-air TV. It gained a 0.32 Sports TV rating which equated to 510,000 two-plus-person households.

Due to the COVID-19 pandemic, MLR adjusted its 2020 season schedule and turned its attention to ensuring the league would rebound with a strong showing in 2021. League and team officials have been "diligently working to build strong rosters and enhance the fan experience" for the season. Matches were televised on CBS Sports Network and Fox Sports 2, among other national and local market platforms. The MLR Championship was broadcast on CBS on Sunday, August 1, 2021.

For the 5th (2022) and 6th (2023) seasons of MLR competition, FOX Sports nationally broadcast select matches on FS1 and FS2.

Finals TV ratings

Streaming
On March 16, 2021, MLR launched The Rugby Network/RugbyPass, a free streaming platform in conjunction with RugbyPass which will stream all MLR content, including matches and highlights. This digital network is the first of its kind in North America, providing rugby fans with a single destination for all their rugby needs. It includes live streaming of select MLR matches, international rugby matches, game highlights, and exclusive behind-the-scenes content.

MLR App
On March 17, 2021, MLR launched its official mobile app. This fan oriented app is where MLR fans come together for breaking MLR news, schedules, match scores, team profiles, statistics, and exclusive video content. The app is part of a multi-platform deal with digital sport innovators PT SportSuite who transforms all MLR's digital media capabilities. The MLR app is available to download on iPhone App Store and Android Google Play.

Attendance
Top attendances for Major League Rugby games (all time, from 2018 onward):

Attendance for the inaugural season was approximately 1,800 per match. That average increased by about 300 per game in 2019 with an average of 2,133 per game and a total of 159,000 attendees. George Killebrew reported that in 2022 an additional 70,000 tickets were sold compared to the 2021 season, with crowd averages remaining around 2,000 per game.

Executives

Commissioner/CEO
 Nic Benson (2023-present)
 George Killebrew (2019–2023)
 Dean Howes (2016–2019)

Deputy Commissioner
 Nic Benson (2016–2023)

Sponsorship 
The Gem Garden in San Marcos, California, makes all MLR Championship rings, as of 2018.

On October 28, 2019, Major League Rugby announced that, starting for the 2020 season, Paladin Sports will be the new supplier of all uniforms/kit for the league.

On January 2, 2020, MLR partnered with Rhino Rugby for the 2020 season. Rhino Rugby is the official ball and technical training equipment supplier for the 2020 MLR season. The Rhino Rugby "Vortex Elite" ball is the official MLR match ball for all 12 teams. The Vortex Elite is currently the official ball of Rugby Europe, and Asia Rugby, and has been used in the Penn Mutual Collegiate Rugby Championship (CRC) the past several years

In March 2021, American Airlines became MLR's official airline and travel partner.

On February 23, 2023, the MLR signed a partnership with OVAL3, the brand specializing in Web3 and fantasy rugby. OVAL3 will be the "Exclusive NFT Fantasy Game" of Major League Rugby. OVAL3 plans to provide "world-class immersive experiences" and Web 3.0 engagement to rugby's rapidly-growing North American fanbase.

See also
United States Rugby Players Association
Women's Premier League Rugby — Women's top competition in the U.S.
PRO Rugby — a professional rugby competition in the U.S. that played only one season in 2016 before folding
Super Rugby Americas — professional rugby competition played predominantly in South America, featuring teams from Argentina, Brazil, Chile, Uruguay, Paraguay, and the United States.
Rugby union in the United States
History of rugby union in the United States
College rugby
North American Rugby League

References

Explanatory notes

Citations

External links
 

 
Professional sports leagues in the United States
Professional sports leagues in Canada
Rugby union leagues in Canada
Rugby union leagues in the United States
2017 establishments in the United States
Sports leagues established in 2017
Multi-national professional rugby union leagues
Multi-national professional sports leagues